James Edward Kenneth Rew (born 11 January 2004) is an English cricketer. In July 2021, Rew was named in the County Select XI squad to play a three-day match against India, during their tour of England. Rew made his first-class debut in the match on 20 July 2021. He made his List A debut on 1 August 2021, for Somerset in the 2021 Royal London One-Day Cup.

In December 2021, he was named in England's team for the 2022 ICC Under-19 Cricket World Cup in the West Indies. He made his Twenty20 debut on 27 May 2022, for Somerset against the Sri Lanka Cricket Development XI during their tour of England. In July 2022, in the County Championship match against Essex, Rew scored his maiden century in first-class cricket.

References

External links
 

2004 births
Living people
English cricketers
Somerset cricketers
People from Lambeth
People educated at King's College, Taunton